Štěpán Koreš (born 14 February 1989) is a Czech football player. He most recently played for FK Dukla Prague until his contract expired in 2018.

References

External links

Koreš-Profile
http://www.dreamstime.com/royalty-free-stock-photos-injured-stepan-kores-from-slavia-prague-image16706018
http://www.uefa.com/uefaeuropaleague/clubs/player=250014763/index.html

1989 births
Living people
Czech footballers
Czech First League players
SK Slavia Prague players
FK Mladá Boleslav players
SK Dynamo České Budějovice players
FC Fastav Zlín players
FK Dukla Prague players
Association football midfielders
Sportspeople from Písek